Mahatma Jyoti Rao Phoole University is located in  Jaipur in Rajasthan, India. It was established by the Mahatma Jyoti Rao Phoole University Act in 2009. The University offers degrees in Agribusiness, Agriculture Science & Technology, Bio Technology / Biotech, Pharmacy, and Fashion Designing courses.

The University collaborates with Macmillan Research Group, UK providing scholarships and co-publication.

References

External links

2009 establishments in Rajasthan
Universities and colleges in Rajasthan
Educational institutions established in 2009